Melphina tarace, the scarce forest swift, is a butterfly in the family Hesperiidae. It is found in Sierra Leone, Ivory Coast, Ghana, Nigeria, Cameroon, the Republic of the Congo, the Central African Republic and north-western Tanzania. The habitat consists of forests.

References

Butterflies described in 1891
Erionotini
Butterflies of Africa